Marek Ziółkowski (born 1955 in Kętrzyn) is a Polish diplomat, ambassador of Poland to Ukraine (2001–2005), Kenya (2012–2015), and NATO (2017–2019).

Life 
Marek Ziółkowski has graduated from philosophy at the University of Warsaw. He was working in the tourism industry.

In 1991 he joined the diplomatic service. He was deputy head of the Polish Consulate-General and Embassy in Mińsk until 1996. From 1997 to 2001 he was the deputy director and director of the Department of Eastern Europe at the Ministry of Foreign Affairs. He served as an ambassador to Ukraine (2001–2005). From 2006 to 2008 he was the deputy director of the Security Policy Department, and then the director of the MFA Department of Development Cooperation (2008–2011). Later, he was Poland ambassador to Kenya, responsible also for the relations with UN-HABITAT, Burundi, Comoros, Madagascar, Mauritius, Rwanda, Somalia, Seychelles, Tanzania and Uganda (2012–2015). In December 2015 he was appointed Undersecretary of State for Eastern and Security Policy at the Ministry of Foreign Affairs. In May 2017, the President of the Republic of Poland appointed him as Permanent Representative of Poland to NATO. He ended his term on 31 March 2019. Since 2021 retired.

He is married and has two children.

Awards 

 Knight's Cross of the Order of Polonia Restituta (2011)
 Order of Prince Yaroslav the Wise, 5th class (2005)

Works

References 

1955 births
Ambassadors of Poland to Ukraine
Ambassadors of Poland to Kenya
Living people
Knights of the Order of Polonia Restituta
People from Kętrzyn
Permanent Representatives of Poland to NATO
Recipients of the Order of Prince Yaroslav the Wise, 5th class
University of Warsaw alumni